The Boz is a right tributary of the river Secaș in Romania. It discharges into the Secaș in Cunța, near Drașov.

References

Rivers of Romania
Rivers of Alba County